The Yutong International Sports Centre Stadium (Simplified Chinese: 裕彤国际体育中心) is a multi-use stadium in Shijiazhuang, Hebei, China.  It is currently used mostly for football matches. The capacity of this stadium is 60,000.

Footnotes

Football venues in China
Sports venues in Hebei